The 382nd Infantry Regiment is an infantry regiment in the United States Army. The unit served as a reserve regiment until it was called to active duty during World War II, whereupon it saw action in the Pacific theater as part of the 96th Infantry Division. The unit returned to reserve status after the war until being deactivated in 1952. The regiment was reactivated as a training unit in 1999.

Service history 
The 382nd Infantry Regiment was first constituted on 5 September 1918, in the National Army and assigned to the 96th Division. It was demobilized less than three months later, on 30 November 1918.

The regiment was reconstituted on 24 June 1921, in the Organized Reserves (predecessor of the U.S. Army Reserve) and was assigned to the 96th Division (later re-designated as the 96th Infantry Division). The 382nd was organized in December 1921 with its headquarters at Medford, Oregon.

Ordered into active-duty service on 15 August 1942, the unit was reorganized at Camp Adair, Oregon, for service in World War II. As part of the 96th Infantry Division, the 382nd participated in the Battle of Leyte from October to December 1944 and the Battle of Okinawa from April to June 1945. The regiment returned to the U.S. and was inactivated on 3 February 1946, at Camp Anza, California.

A year later, on 10 January 1947, the 382nd Infantry was re-activated into the Organized Reserves (re-designated as the Army Reserve in 1952) with its headquarters at Boise, Idaho. It was inactivated again on 1 March 1952, and relieved from its assignment to the 96th Infantry Division. Re-designated on 17 October 1999, as the 382nd Regiment, the unit was reorganized to consist of the 1st, 2nd, and 3rd Battalions, elements of the 75th Division (Training Support).

Awards and honors 

Unit decorations
 Presidential Unit Citation for Okinawa
 Philippine Republic Presidential Unit Citation for 17 October 1944 to 4 July 1945

Individual decorations
Three men earned the U.S. military's highest decoration, the Medal of Honor, while serving with the 382nd Infantry. These were Private First Class Clarence B. Craft of Company G, for assaulting Japanese-held Hen Hill on Okinawa; Private Ova A. Kelley of Company A, mortally wounded after leading an attack during the Battle of Leyte; and First Lieutenant Seymour W. Terry of Company B, mortally wounded during the fight for Zebra Hill on Okinawa.

References 

382
Infantry regiments of the United States Army in World War II